Zakarpattia Lowland ( / Transcarpathian Lowland) or Upper Tysa Lowland is a lowland in the southwestern portion of the Zakarpattia Oblast in the drainage basin of Tisza river and located on its right banks. The plain stretches along the Hungary-Ukraine border.

The lowland contains most of the population of region and includes all its major cities such as Uzhhorod, Mukachevo, Berehove, Vynohradiv and others.

See also
 Pannonian plain
 Vihorlat-Gutin Area

References

Plains of Ukraine
Great Hungarian Plain
Zakarpattia Oblast